Zareen Panna, also known as Panna or Zarrin (Urdu; زرین; born 1947) is a Pakistani actress and former classical dancer. She acted in both Urdu and Punjabi films.

Early life
Zareen was born in 1947 in Shimla, India. She along with her family migrated to Pakistan in Karachi. Zareen was interested in arts and dancing from a young age. Comdeian Sultan Khoosat father of actor Irfan Khoosat was a friend of her family, he introduced her to Ghulam Hussain (Patiala Gharana) and stad Shado Maharaj (Dehli Gharana). They trained her in classical dancing and later Mukhtar Begum sister of Farida Khanum helped her in dancing and at that time she was taught by Rafi Anwar, Siddique Samrat and Madam Azuri. 

Zareen attended a school to become a doctor to help her family. Her mother supported her decision to become a doctor because she wanted her to become one. She also took dancing classes, as she enjoyed dancing and decided to become a dancer. Later, Zareen attended Islamia Girs College in Karachi. From there, she completed her studies.

Zareen's father, Nawab Khalil, was an adviser in the court of Maharaja of Patiala and her mother was a housewife.

Career
Zareen started as a child actress. She first did advertisements for leading brands of that time. After that, she learned Bharatanatyam, Khattak and Kathakali dancing. She achieving national and international recognition at a very young age and in 1958, she was awarded Sitara-i-Imtiaz by the President of Pakistan Ayub Khan. In 1960, she made her debut as an actress in 1960 in the film Gharib and had a successful career. She worked in multiple films, such as Insaan Badalta Hai, Lakhon Fasanay, Sukh Ka Sapna, Insaan Badalta Hai and Taj Aur Talwar. She also performed in front of Pakistan President Iskander Mirza, appreciating her and also doing live performances in front of former prime ministers Feroz Khan Noon and Zulfikar Ali Bhutto. In 1959, she also did a performance for President of United States Dwight D. Eisenhower during his visit to Pakistan at The Palace Hotel.

In 1961, she did a classical performance for Queen Elizabeth II when she visited Pakistan with her husband Prince Philip.

She was invited by former prime minister Feroz Khan Noon to perform in front of King of Afghanistan Mohammed Zahir Shah. When president Sukarno visited Pakistan in 1963, she performed a live dance show for him. 

She also went to China, performing in the Palace of Mao Zedong. She also went to Russia, participating in a cultural festival at Moscow.

In 2018, she a did a live dance performance for prince Aga Khan IV when he visited Pakistan. For her contributions towards the television and film industry, she was honored by the Government of Pakistan with the Pride of Performance in 2018.

Personal life
In the 1960s, Zareen married actor and film director S. Suleman, brother of actors Santosh Kumar, Mansoor and Darpan. She was a close relative of actresses Sabiha Khanum and Nayyar Sultana. She has five children, with three sons and two daughters. After 25 years, she and S. Suleman separated, but they did not divorced and she took the custody of their children.

Filmography

Film

Awards and recognition

References

External links
 
 
 

1947 births
Living people
20th-century Pakistani actresses
Actresses in Punjabi cinema
Recipients of Sitara-i-Imtiaz
Pakistani film actresses
21st-century Pakistani actresses
Pakistani television actresses
Recipients of the Pride of Performance
Actresses in Urdu cinema